Cristine Brache (born 1984 in Miami) is an American artist, filmmaker, and writer of Puerto Rican and Cuban descent. Her work spans video, sculpture, and poetry. She has since 2012 been exhibited internationally, in Europe, North America, and Australia. Her debut book, Poems, was published by Codette in 2018.

Education 

Brache holds an MFA in Fine Art Media from the Slade School of Fine Art in London. She graduated from Florida State University in 2007 with a BFA in Studio Art, and attended Miami Southridge Senior High School.

Career 
From October 28 to November 28, 2018, Brache was a resident artist with Embajada in partnership with Artist Alliance Inc. (AAI) and Clemente Soto Vélez Cultural & Educational Center (The Clemente), in New York City. Her work has been reviewed positively by the New York Times, Cultured, and the New Yorker. Her films have screened at Slamdance Film Festival, the Florida Film Festival, and Maryland Film Festival.

Her work is in the ICA Miami's permanent collection.

Themes 
The artist often takes her personal and family history as a starting point to explore cultural erasure (of the Caribbean Diaspora), shared histories and trauma, womanhood, and the inevitable power dynamics that accompany these themes. Brache is interested in how people codify their behaviors and appearances for survival and adaptation in oppressive environments. In previous works she's also explored the institutionalization of women’s pain and illness, as well as the ramifications of gaslighting—the pathologization of female emotion and expression. She articulates personal histories of female oppression with the wider context of history and art history. More recently, Brache is interested in the loss of meaning and time, nostalgia, notions of faith, love, and death.

Her poetry is described as "unapologetic...often placing the reader in the position of the voyeur, Brache’s poems ambiguously deal with identity, power dynamics, and templates of the female body and psyche."

Personal life 
From 2009 through 2014, Brache expatriated from the United States to squat in the United Kingdom, Europe, Turkey, and Thailand. She eventually moved to China, where she lived for two and a half years. In 2016, she married Canadian artist and writer Brad Phillips.

Exhibitions

Solo exhibitions 

Bermuda Triangle, Anonymous Gallery, 2022
Commit Me; Commit to Me, Fierman Gallery, 2020.
Cristine's Secret Garden, Locust Projects, 2019.
Go to Heaven (with Brad Phillips), Mana Contemporary, 2019.
Epithalamium (with Brad Phillips), Anat Ebgi, 2019.
Fucking Attention, MECA Art Fair, Fierman Gallery, 2018.
I love me, I love me not, Fierman Gallery, 2017.

Books 

 Poems. New York: Codette (2018). ISBN 9780997062038.

Awards 

 2021: The Ellies Awards, Oolite Arts
 2019: The Ellies Awards, Oolite Arts
 2018: South Florida Cultural Consortium

References

External links 

 Cristine Brache's website
 Cristine Brache at Anonymous Gallery
 Cristine Brache at Fierman Gallery
 Holly Child's Interviews Cristine Brache
 Monica Uszerowicz Interviews Cristine Brache
 Three Poems on New York Tyrant Magazine

Living people
Feminist artists
American artists
21st-century American poets
1984 births
Artists from Miami
Alumni of the Slade School of Fine Art